Wechingen is a municipality  in the district of Donau-Ries in Bavaria in Germany.

Population development
Year: Inhabitants
1961: 1460 
1970: 1464 
1987: 1317 
1995: 1348 
2000: 1384 
2010: 1378 
2015: 1428

References

Donau-Ries